Triumph Motorcycles Ltd is the largest UK-owned motorcycle manufacturer, established in 1983 by John Bloor after the original company Triumph Engineering went into receivership. The new company, initially called Bonneville Coventry Ltd, continued Triumph's lineage of motorcycle production since 1902. They have major manufacturing facilities in Thailand.

During the 12 months preceding June 2017, Triumph sold 63,400 motorcycles.

History

When Triumph Engineering went into receivership in 1983, John Bloor bought the name and manufacturing rights from the Official Receiver. The new company's manufacturing plant was outdated and unable to compete against the technology from Japanese manufacturers, so Bloor decided against relaunching Triumph immediately. Initially, production of the old Bonneville was continued under licence by Les Harris of Racing Spares, in Newton Abbot, Devon, to bridge the gap between the end of the old company and the start of the new company. For five years from 1983, about 14 a week were built at peak production. In the United States, owing to problems with liability insurance, the Harris Bonnevilles were never imported.

Bloor set to work assembling the then-new Triumph business, hiring several of the group's former designers to begin work on new models. The team visited Japan on a tour of its competitors' facilities and decided to adopt Japanese manufacturing techniques and especially new-generation computer-controlled machinery. In 1985, Triumph purchased a first set of equipment to begin working, in secret, on its new prototype models. By 1987, the company had completed its first engine. In 1988, Bloor funded the building of a new factory at a  site in Hinckley, Leicestershire. The first Hinckley Triumphs were produced for the 1991 model year. Bloor put between £70 million and £100 million into the company between purchasing the brand and breaking even in 2000.

At the same time as production capacity increased, Bloor established a new network of export distributors. He had previously created two subsidiary companies, Triumph Deutschland GmbH and Triumph France SA. In 1994, Bloor created Triumph Motorcycles America Ltd.

At 21:00 on 15 March 2002, as the company was preparing to celebrate its 100th anniversary as a motorcycle maker, half of the main factory including the assembly area and stores was destroyed by a fire which began at the rear of the facility. At the height of the blaze, over 100 firefighters with 30 vehicles were tackling the fire. Nevertheless, the company, which by then employed more than 650, quickly rebuilt the facility and returned to production by September that year.

In May 2002, Triumph began construction on a new sub-assembly manufacturing facility in Chonburi, Thailand to make various components. A second factory was opened in 2006 by Prince Andrew, Duke of York where a wet painting facility and assembly line have been established. A third factory was opened in 2007 to include high pressure die-casting and machining, and Triumph announced that they were expanding to increase capacity to over 130,000 motorcycles. Triumph Motorcycles (Thailand) Limited is a 100% UK owned company and now employs about 1000 staff.

In June 2009 Digby Jones, Baron Jones of Birmingham, the former Minister of State for Trade, became chairman and the  Thunderbird twin-cylinder cruiser was announced.

In early 2011 Nick Bloor, John Bloor's son, took over from Tue Mantoni as CEO of Triumph Motorcycles and in 2017 Triumph opened a new £4 million visitor centre, along with a collection of Triumph motorcycles, memorabilia, and a factory tour.
In February 2020 it was announced that Triumph would be moving the remainder of large scale motorcycle production, including the Tiger 1200 and Speed Triple production lines to their Thailand factories, leaving only the specialist Triumph Factory Customs and prototype builds remaining in the UK.  Whilst the R&D department remains within the UK (and 20 additional staff have been taken on in that department), substantially larger redundancies were announced amongst production staff.

In a press release dated 20 July 2021, Triumph announced a factory off-road competition programme to create new motocross and enduro machines. In the same release they announced the participation of seven time AMA motocross and five time supercross champion Ricky Carmichael and five time enduro champion Iván Cervantes in the development of the new bikes.

Financial performance
In 2017, Triumph's revenue increased by 22 per cent to £498.5 million and this increased pre-tax profits to £24.7 million from £16.6 million the previous year.

Over 85 per cent of motorcycles are now sold in overseas markets, but the 9,400 motorcycles sold in the UK in 2017 represents a record for the company.

Bloor invested over £80 million in Triumph Motorcycles before it first broke even in 2000.

During the 2008 recession, Bloor Holdings – which controls Triumph - breached its banking covenants but was able to re-negotiate its loans with lenders.

Model range

A range of new 750 cc and 900 cc triple-cylinder bikes and 1000 cc and 1200 cc four-cylinder bikes were launched at the September 1990 Cologne Motorcycle Show. The motorcycles used famous model names from the glory days of Meriden Triumph and were first made available to the public between March (Trophy 1200 being the first) and September 1991. All used a modular liquid-cooled DOHC engine design in a common large diameter steel backbone frame. The modular design was to ensure that a variety of models could be offered whilst keeping production costs under control—an idea originally put forward, in air-cooled form, in the early 1970s by Bert Hopwood but not implemented by the then BSA-Triumph company.

The first models, known generically as the T300s, all used a common piston diameter (76 mm) in a common wet cylinder liner. Basic engine variations were achieved through the use of two specifications of piston stroke: 65 mm to create individual cylinder capacity of 300 cc, and 55mm to create a 250 cc individual cylinder. Two 750 cc models were released – and the Daytona and Trident 750 triples (3 x 250 cc). There was one 1000 cc model – the Daytona 1000 four (4 x 250 cc). Two 900 cc models were the Trophy 900 and Trident 900 triples (3 x 300 cc). The Trophy 1200 four was the largest model (4 x 300 cc). All were remarkably smooth running. The three cylinder models were equipped with a contra-rotating balance shaft mounted at the front of the engine. The four cylinder models benefitted from twin balance shafts – unique at the time – mounted beneath the crank shaft. Contemporary road tests noted the solidity and smoothness of performance as positives but the weight of the machines as negatives. For brand new machines produced by a totally new concern, there were remarkably few early problems. These were an insecure oil pressure switch and a longer-lived problem with the starter (or sprag clutch). The cosmetic finish on the first machines was simple and not very robust. Revisions to crankcases for the three-cylinder models in 1993, together with a move to high pressure casting, reduced engine weight considerably. All painting and plating operations were brought in house in 1993, as the Hinckley factory benefitted from further investment after the initial success of the range. The result was improved quality and durability of finish, added to the basic engineering integrity of the engine and chassis, made for a long-lasting and robust motorcycle.

The range was largely revised in 1997 with the release of the T500 range, followed by a light-weight four-cylinder 600 cc sports TT600. The 600 was a major design departure and initially received a poor press: "unpleasant at low revs due to a lethargic and unpredictable throttle response, with anonymous styling". As sales built, the big fours were phased out of the lineup and parallel twins and triples became the marketing and development focus of Triumph's marketing strategy. Triumph also decided to exploit demand for retro motorcycles with modern engineering. The Triumph Thunderbird 900 exploited the styling cues of the 'old' Triumphs legendary designer, Edward Turner whilst retaining the modern triple engine. The 790 and 865 cc versions of the Triumph Bonneville and Thruxton look and sound original but internally they have modern valves and counterbalance shafts.

For their contemporary range, the triple is Hinckley Triumph's trademark, filling a niche between European and American twins and four-cylinder Japanese machinery. The  triple Rocket III cruiser was introduced in 2004. The first 300 Rocket III models were already sold before they were produced, and there was a long waiting list for Rockets into 2005.

On 21 July 2008, Triumph held a Global Dealer Conference where new models for 2009 were launched, including the official announcement of the parallel twin-cylinder Thunderbird.

Triumph's best selling bike is the 675 cc Street Triple. In 2010 they launched the Triumph Tiger 800 and Tiger 800 XC, dual-sport motorcycles, which uses an 800 cc engine derived from the Street Triple, and is designed to compete directly with the market leading BMW F800GS.
In 2012, the Tiger 800 was joined by the shaft-driven Triumph Tiger Explorer.

Current Line Up

Adventure 

 Tiger Sport 660
 Tiger Sport 1050
 Tiger 850 Sport 
 Tiger 900 GT
 Tiger 900 Rally
 Tiger 1200 GT
 Tiger 1200 Rally

Roadster 

 Trident 660
 Street Triple
 Speed Triple

Sport Bike 
 Daytona Moto2 765

Classic 

 Street Twin
 Bonneville T100
 Street Scrambler
 Speed Twin
 Bonneville T120
 Bonneville Bobber
 Bonneville Speedmaster
 Scrambler 1200
 Thruxton RS

Power Cruiser 
 Rocket 3

E-Bike 

 Trekker

Triumph Factory Custom motorcycles 

In December 2018, Triumph said they were developing a new range of high spec limited edition motorcycles, called Triumph Factory Custom (TFC). The first model was the Thruxton TFC, with production run limited to 750 units. In May 2019, the second model, the Rocket 3 TFC, was introduced at a motorbike show at Shoreditch, London. In November 2019, Triumph announced a third TFC model, the Bobber TFC, at the EICMA Motorcycle Show in Milan.

Racing 
From 2019 season onwards for a three-year term, Triumph were awarded the contract to be the controlled-engine supplier for the FIM Moto2 World Championship. This was extended in 2021 for at least another three years. All Moto2 teams changed from a Honda CBR600 unit to a 765 cc triple-cylinder engine supplied by Triumph that was originally developed from the Street Triple RS engine, but with additional race tuning that creates at least 138PS peak power. Engines are prepared by ExternPro, an independent business based in Spain.

Marketing, product placement, and brand management
 

In 1995, Triumph began selling the Triple Connection clothing and accessories range of products, designed by Triumph rather than licensed. In the 21st century, Triumph marketed lines of clothing with endorsements or likenesses of celebrities associated with the brand in the past, including Bob Dylan, and the deceased Marlon Brando, Elvis Presley, James Dean, and Steve McQueen. McQueen's name and likeness were particularly put to use, such as naming a special edition Bonneville after him.

See also
Triumph Cycle (1884–1930) original Triumph, founded by Siegfried Bettmann
Triumph (TWN) (1896–1956) German manufacturer also founded by Bettmann
Triumph Motor Company (1930–1936) precursor to Triumph Engineering (1936–1983)
Triumph Owners Motor Cycle Club

Sources

External links

 
Motorcycle manufacturers of the United Kingdom
Companies based in Leicestershire
Motor vehicle assembly plants in the United Kingdom
English brands
British companies established in 1984
Vehicle manufacturing companies established in 1984